Medb ingen Indrechtach, Queen of Ailech, fl. 8th century.

Family tree

     Indrechtaig, died 723.                                                    
     |                                                                           
     |_               
     |                    |                     |      |              |               
     |                    |                     |      |              |               
     Áed Balb (died 742)  Muiredach (died 732)  Tadg   Murgal         Medb      
                                               =?                   = Áed Oirdnide     
                                                |                     |
                                                |                     |
                                                Tipraiti              Niall Caille
                                                |                     |
                                                |                     |
                                          Síol Muireadaigh        Áed Findliath

Notes

References

 Byrne, Francis John (2001), Irish Kings and High-Kings, Dublin: Four Courts Press, 
 Gearoid Mac Niocaill (1972), Ireland before the Vikings, Dublin: Gill and Macmillan

External links
CELT: Corpus of Electronic Texts at University College Cork

People from County Roscommon
7th-century Irish people
8th-century Irish people
Irish royal consorts
7th-century Irish women
8th-century Irish women